Bhuvanaikabahu II was King of Dambadeniya in the 14th century, who ruled 1310 from to 1325/6. He succeeded his cousin Parakkamabahu III as King of Dambadeniya and was succeeded by his son Parakkamabahu IV.

See also
 List of Sri Lankan monarchs
 History of Sri Lanka

References

External links
 Kings & Rulers of Sri Lanka
 Codrington's Short History of Ceylon

Monarchs of Dambadeniya
House of Siri Sanga Bo
B
B